Elections to Larne Borough Council were held on 15 May 1985 on the same day as the other Northern Irish local government elections. The election used three district electoral areas to elect a total of 15 councillors.

Election results

Note: "Votes" are the first preference votes.

Districts summary

|- class="unsortable" align="centre"
!rowspan=2 align="left"|Ward
! % 
!Cllrs
! % 
!Cllrs
! %
!Cllrs
! %
!Cllrs
!rowspan=2|TotalCllrs
|- class="unsortable" align="center"
!colspan=2 bgcolor="" | DUP
!colspan=2 bgcolor="" | UUP
!colspan=2 bgcolor="" | Alliance
!colspan=2 bgcolor="white"| Others
|-
|align="left"|Coast Road
|bgcolor="D46A4C"|36.7
|bgcolor="D46A4C"|2
|28.9
|1
|12.9
|1
|21.5
|1
|5
|-
|align="left"|Larne Lough
|40.4
|2
|bgcolor="40BFF5"|50.0
|bgcolor="40BFF5"|3
|9.6
|0
|0.0
|0
|5
|-
|align="left"|Larne Town
|bgcolor="D46A4C"|41.1
|bgcolor="D46A4C"|2
|32.6
|2
|26.3
|1
|0.0
|0
|5
|-
|- class="unsortable" class="sortbottom" style="background:#C9C9C9"
|align="left"| Total
|39.4
|6
|37.3
|6
|16.4
|2
|6.9
|1
|15
|-
|}

District results

Coast Road

1985: 2 x DUP, 1 x UUP, 1 x Alliance, 1 x Independent Nationalist

Larne Lough

1985: 3 x UUP, 2 x DUP

Larne Town

1985: 2 x UUP, 2 x DUP, 1 x Alliance

References

Larne Borough Council elections
Larne